The Black and Asian Studies Association (BASA) was set up in London in 1991. Until October 1997 it was known as the Association for the Study of African, Caribbean and Asian Culture and History In Britain (ASACACHIB).

Founder members who attended the inaugural meeting at the Institute of Commonwealth Studies on 5 February 1991 include Stephen Bourne, Jeffrey Green, David Killingray, Marika Sherwood and Hakim Adi. The Association was set up to foster research and to provide information on the history of Black peoples in Britain. This has been done through a triannual Newsletter - first published in September 1991 - and an annual conference. They have also worked with local organisations to highlight the Black Presence in British society.

BASA has lobbied government departments and quangoes, such as:
 English Heritage - blue plaques
 Qualifications and Curriculum Authority - school curriculum
 Museums, Libraries and Archives Council (formerly Resource) regarding archives, libraries and museums.

Other work involves specific projects with other organisations, including:
 CASBAH: a pilot website providing research resources relating to Caribbean Studies and the history of Black and Asian peoples in the UK.
 The National Archives' website on the history of Black peoples in Britain since the mid-16th century.

References

External links
BASA official website
CASBAH

1991 establishments in the United Kingdom
Asian-British culture in London
Afro-Caribbean culture in London
Black British culture in London
Black British history
Educational organisations based in London
Organizations established in 1991